Håkollen Island is an island  long, rising to , lying in the southwest part of the Øygarden Group, Antarctica. It was mapped by Norwegian cartographers from aerial photos taken by the Lars Christensen Expedition, 1936–37, and called Håkollen (the shark knoll).

See also 
 List of Antarctic and sub-Antarctic islands

References

Islands of Kemp Land